Prepops is a genus of plant bugs in the family Miridae. There are at least 190 described species in Prepops.

See also
 List of Prepops species

References

Further reading

External links

 

Miridae genera
Restheniini